Desk Top Hard Lock is the first studio album by Phnonpenh MODEL and the first solo album by Hikaru Kotobuki.

The band was formed to participate in the Errors of P-MANIA! copy band contest, where they performed the song "Be in a Fix" (from the album Perspective) while sampling "Immigrant Song", among the other members there was the cross-dressing Lion Merry (formerly of Yapoos, Metrofarce, Virgin VS) and Shonen Maruta (formerly of Ikiru), both members of the band echo-U-nite.

It mixes the electronic sounds used by Kotobuki on the "Defrosted" era of P-Model with ethnic sounds inspired by his travels through the world and the overall mood is marked by Kotobukii's peculiar sense of humor; it also features some sound alteration that Kotobuki would explore in later releases.

After this album was released, Kotobuki sold all his musical instruments and travelled through Asia, which left Phnonpenh MODEL inactive until 1997.

Track listing
All songs arranged by Hikaru Kotobuki and Lion Merry.

Track 3 is a rerecording/remix of the P-Model song of the same name from Big Body, track 8 is a partial a capella rendition of "Lab=01" from the album P-Model, track 10 is a remix of "Opening SE 1992", P-Model's 'walk on' show opening music.

Personnel
Hikaru Kotobuki - Keyboard, Vocal, Victory 3000, Production
Lion Merry - Keyboard, Vocal, Kalimba
Masaaki "Shonen Maruta" Taniguchi - Vocal, Overtone, Tibetan Bell
Thaniya Patpong - Guitar, Vocal, Mandolin
Masami Fujii, DIW - Co-Production
Takeshi Fujita - Direction
Motohiro Yamada - Mixing
Kiyoshi Inagaki - Art director
Nakagawa-san - Photography
Susumu Hirasawa - Liner notes

External links
Desk Top Hard Lock at Hikaru Kotobuki's official website
Desk Top Hard Lock at last.fm
Desk Top Hard Lock at amazon.com
Desk Top Hard Lock at iTunes

1994 albums
DIW Records albums
Japanese-language albums